William Pinckney McLean (August 9, 1836 –March 13, 1925) was a United States Representative from Texas.

Biography
Born in Copiah County, Mississippi, McLean moved with his mother to Marshall, Texas, in 1839.
He attended private schools and was graduated from the law department of the University of North Carolina at Chapel Hill in 1857.
He was admitted to the bar in 1857 and commenced the practice of his profession at Jefferson, Texas.
He served as member of the State house of representatives in 1861.
He resigned to enter the Confederate States Army as a private of the 19th Texas Infantry Regiment, Walker's Texas Division.
He was promoted to captain and then major, and served throughout the Civil War.
He was again a member of the State house of representatives in 1869.

McLean was elected as a Democrat to the Forty-third Congress (March 4, 1873 – March 3, 1875).
He was not a candidate for renomination in 1874.
He resumed the practice of law in Mount Pleasant, Texas.
He served as member of the State constitutional convention in 1875.

McLean was elected judge of the fifth judicial district in 1884.
He declined to be a candidate for reelection.
He was appointed by Governor Hogg as a member of the first State railroad commission in 1891.
He resigned and moved to Fort Worth, Texas, in 1893.
He resumed the practice of his profession.
He died in Fort Worth on March 13, 1925.
He was interred in Mount Olivet Cemetery.

References

Sources

1836 births
1925 deaths
Confederate States Army officers
Democratic Party members of the United States House of Representatives from Texas
Democratic Party members of the Texas House of Representatives
People from Copiah County, Mississippi
People from Marshall, Texas
People from Jefferson, Texas
People from Mount Pleasant, Texas
People from Fort Worth, Texas
Military personnel from Texas